Uran or Urán may refer to the following people:

Given named
Uran Botobekov (born 1967), Kyrgyz scholar, journalist, diplomat and publicist
Uran Kalilov (born 1980), Greco-Roman wrestler from Kyrgyzstan

Surnamed
 Alojz Uran (born 1945), Slovenian archbishop
Carlos Urán (born 1980), Colombian cyclist
Heriberto Urán (born 1954), Colombian cyclist 
Hilmi Uran (1886–1957), Turkish politician and government minister
 Juan Urán (born 1983), Colombian diver
Presentación Urán González (born 1956), Spanish politician
 Rigoberto Urán (born 1987), Colombian road racing cyclist

Fictional characters
Uran (character), aka AstroGirl, the Astro Boy character